Aluminium clofibrate (or alfibrate) is a fibrate.

See also
 Clofibrate

References

2-Methyl-2-phenoxypropanoic acid derivatives
Chloroarenes
Aluminium compounds